The Antilocapridae are a family of artiodactyls endemic to North America. Their closest extant relatives are the giraffids with which they comprise the superfamily Giraffoidea. Only one species, the pronghorn (Antilocapra americana), is living today; all other members of the family are extinct. The living pronghorn is a small ruminant mammal resembling an antelope.

Description
In most respects, antilocaprids resemble other ruminants. They have a complex, four-chambered stomach for digesting tough plant matter, cloven hooves, and small, forked horns. Their horns resemble those of the bovids, in that they have a true horny sheath, but, uniquely, they are shed outside the breeding season, and subsequently regrown. Their lateral toes are even further diminished than in bovids, with the digits themselves being entirely lost, and only the cannon bones remaining. Antilocaprids have the same dental formula as most other ruminants: .

Classification
The antilocaprids are ruminants of the clade Pecora. Other extant pecorans are the families Giraffidae (giraffes), Cervidae (deer), Moschidae (musk deer), and Bovidae (cattle, goats and sheep, wildebeests and allies, and antelopes). The exact interrelationships among the pecorans have been debated, mainly focusing on the placement of Giraffidae, but a recent large-scale ruminant genome sequencing study suggests Antilocapridae are the sister taxon to Giraffidae, as shown in the cladogram below.

Evolution
The ancestors of pronghorn diverged from the giraffids in the Early Miocene. This was in part of a relatively late mammal diversification following a climate change that transformed subtropical woodlands into open savannah grasslands.

The antilocaprids evolved in North America, where they filled a niche similar to that of the bovids that evolved in the Old World. During the Miocene and Pliocene, they were a diverse and successful group, with many different species. Some had horns with bizarre shapes, or had four, or even six, horns. Examples include Osbornoceros, with smooth, slightly curved horns, Paracosoryx, with flattened horns that widened to forked tips, Ramoceros, with fan-shaped horns, and Hayoceros, with four horns.

Species
Subfamily Antilocaprinae
Tribe Antilocaprini
Genus Antilocapra
Antilocapra americana - pronghorn
A. a. americana - Common pronghorn
A. a. mexicana - Mexican pronghorn
A. a. peninsularis - Baja California pronghorn
A. a. sonoriensis - Sonoran pronghorn
A. a. oregona - Oregon pronghorn
†Antilocapra pacifica
Genus †Texoceros
Texoceros altidens
Texoceros edensis
Texoceros guymonensis
Texoceros minorei
Texoceros texanus
Texoceros vaughani
Tribe †Ilingoceratini
Genus †Ilingoceros
Ilingoceros alexandrae
Ilingoceros schizoceros
Genus †Ottoceros
Ottoceros peacevalleyensis
Genus †Plioceros
Plioceros blicki
Plioceros dehlini
Plioceros floblairi
Genus †Sphenophalos
Sphenophalos garciae
Sphenophalos middleswarti
Sphenophalos nevadanus
Tribe †Proantilocaprini
Genus †Proantilocapra
Proantilocapra platycornea
Genus †Osbornoceros
Osbornoceros osborni
Tribe Stockoceratini
Genus †Capromeryx - (junior synonym Breameryx)
Capromeryx arizonensis - (junior synonym B. arizonensis)
Capromeryx furcifer - (junior synonyms B. minimus, C. minimus)Capromeryx gidleyi - (junior synonym B. gidleyi)Capromeryx mexicana - (junior synonym B. mexicana)Capromeryx minor - (junior synonym B. minor)Capromeryx tauntonensisGenus †CeratomeryxCeratomeryx prenticeiGenus †HayocerosHayoceros barbouriHayoceros falkenbachiGenus †HexameryxHexameryx simpsoniGenus †HexobelomeryxHexobelomeryx frickiHexobelomeryx simpsoniGenus †StockocerosStockoceros conklingi (junior synonym S. onusrosagris) 
Genus †TetrameryxTetrameryx irvingtonensisTetrameryx knoxensisTetrameryx mooseriTetrameryx shuleriTetrameryx tacubayensisSubfamily †Merycodontinae
Genus †CosoryxCosoryx cerroensisCosoryx furcatusCosoryx ilfonensisGenus †MerriamocerosMerriamoceros coronatusGenus †Merycodus (syn. Meryceros and Submeryceros)Merycodus crucensisMerycodus hookwayiMerycodus jorakiMerycodus majorMerycodus minimusMerycodus minorMerycodus necatusMerycodus nenzelensisMerycodus prodromusMerycodus sabulonisMerycodus warreniGenus †ParacosoryxParacosoryx alticornisParacosoryx burgensisParacosoryx dawesensisParacosoryx furlongiParacosoryx loxocerosParacosoryx nevadensisParacosoryx wilsoniGenus †RamocerosRamoceros brevicornisRamoceros marthaeRamoceros merriamiRamoceros osborniRamoceros palmatusRamoceros ramosus''

References 

Mammal families
Extant Miocene first appearances
Taxa named by John Edward Gray